In a Class of His Own is a 1999 American made-for-television drama film starring Lou Diamond Phillips and based on a true story. The film originally aired on Showtime on October 17, 1999.

Plot
A high School janitor must go back to school to get his GED in order to keep his job.

Cast
Lou Diamond Phillips as Ricardo "Rich" Donato
Lee Jay Bamberry as Freddy
Lenno Britos as Mr. Guiterrez
A.J. Buckley as Jake Matteson
Cara Buono as Sherry Donato
Joan Chen as Linda Ching

References

External links

1999 television films
1999 films
1999 drama films
Showtime (TV network) films
American drama television films
1990s English-language films
1990s American films
English-language drama films